TMSR-LF1 (液态燃料钍基熔盐实验堆; "liquid fuel thorium-based molten salt experimental reactor") is a 2 MWt molten salt reactor (MSR) pilot plant located in northwest China.

History 

In January 2011, the Chinese Academy of Sciences (CAS) began the TMSR research and development project to create reactors which, among other advances, will be air-cooled. CAS assigned the project to its Shanghai Institute of Applied Physics (SINAP), which now has MSR research and design facilities in the Jiading District. The liquid fuel ("LF") design is based on the 1960s Molten-Salt Reactor Experiment at Oak Ridge National Laboratory in the US. The TMSR project is led by Xu Hongjie (徐洪杰), who previously headed the construction of the Shanghai Synchrotron Radiation Facility. The site selected for the TMSR-LF1 is part of an industrial park in a sparsely populated, arid region. Construction began in September 2018 and was expected to finish in August 2021, with testing to follow. In August 2022, the Chinese Ministry of Ecology and Environment informed SINAP that its commissioning plan for the LF1 had been approved.  Full power operation is expected in February 2023.

Specifications
The TMSR-LF1 is a Generation IV reactor being constructed with the following specifications:

 Thermal power: 2MW
 Fuel salt: FLiBe (>99.95% Li-7) with fluorides of zirconium, uranium (HALEU: 19.75% U-235), and thorium
 inlet temperature: 630 °C
 outlet temperature: 650 °C
 volume: 1.68 m3
 flow rate: ~50 kg/s
 Coolant salt: FLiBe
 inlet temperature: 560 °C
 outlet temperature: 580 °C
 flow rate: ~42 kg/s
 Cover gas: Argon (0.05 MPa)
 volume: 1.6 m3
 Moderator: nuclear graphite
 Structural Material: UNS N10003 superalloy
 Lifetime: 10 years
 Equivalent full power days: 300
 Max full power days per year: 60

Future plans
A small modular reactor based on the LF1, as well as a fuel salt research facility, is planned for the same site. New reactor specifications include: core graphite 3 m tall x 2.2 m wide, 700 °C operating temperature, 60 MW thermal output, and an experimental supercritical carbon dioxide-based closed-cycle gas turbine to covert the thermal output to 10 MW of electricity. The referenced document mentions two pairs of dates for groundbreaking/criticality and full power in different sections for the 10MWe reactor; 2023/2026, and 2025/2029.

Scaled-up commercial reactors based on the LF1 are likely in the 2030s in central and western China, and may also be built outside China in Belt and Road Initiative nations; as low-carbon power plants, they would help to achieve the Chinese government's 2060 goal of carbon neutrality.

References

Notes 
 the LF1 reactor is sited within an industrial park located in Hongshagang (town), Minqin (county), Wuwei (prefecture), Gansu (province), China. As per official documentation, the TMSR-LF1 site is located at 38°57'31" N, 102°36'55" E. However, due to the China GPS shift problem, the location using Western GPS coordinates is about 38°57'36" N, 102°36'43" E (approximately a third of a kilometer offset).

External links 

 Molten Salt Reactors ("China's dual programme" section) from the World Nuclear Association
 IAEA Research Reactor Database See TMSR-LF1 entry (CN0021)

Buildings and structures in Gansu
Molten salt reactors
Nuclear technology in China